Yeniyürük  is a  village in Aydıncık district of Mersin Province, Turkey. The village is situated in the Toros Mountains. The population of the Yeniyürük was 103 in 2012. The main economic activity of the village is animal breeding.

References

Villages in Aydıncık District (Mersin)